Radiodifusión Nacional del Uruguay (RNU, "National Broadcasting of Uruguay") is the public radio broadcaster of the country of Uruguay. It operates four separate radio stations.

History

The first Uruguayan national broadcaster, SODRE (Official Radio Broadcasting Service), was inaugurated in 1929, and its first station, CX6 650 AM (now Radio Clásica), launched on 1 April 1930. Two additional AM services were added: CX26 1050 AM Radio Uruguay, a national speech station, and CX38 1290 AM Emisora del Sur, focused on music. They have since been joined by Babel, an instrumental music station.

As a result of a reorganization of public media in Uruguay, the new  (National Audiovisual Communication Service) was created in 2015, unifying formerly separate radio, film, and television agencies.

Services
In Montevideo, each of the four stations operates around the clock. Most of the rest of the country is served by a network of regional repeaters that primarily airs programs from Radio Uruguay.

Repeater network

References

External links

2015 establishments in Uruguay
Radio in Uruguay
Organizations based in Montevideo
Government-owned companies of Uruguay
Public radio